The 2015–16 Mid-American Conference men's basketball season began with practices in October 2015, followed by the start of the 2015–16 NCAA Division I men's basketball season in November. Conference play began in January 2016 and concluded in March 2016. Akron won the regular season title with a conference record of 13–5 over second place Ohio. Third-seeded Buffalo defeated Akron in the MAC tournament final and represented the MAC in the NCAA tournament where they lost to Miami (FL) in the first round..

Preseason awards
The preseason poll and league awards were announced by the league office on October 28, 2015.

Preseason men's basketball poll
(First place votes in parenthesis)

East Division
 Akron 132 (17)
 Kent State 116 (5)
 Ohio 69
 Buffalo 64 (1)
 Miami 60
 Bowling Green 42

West Division
 Central Michigan 138 (23)
 Toledo 110
 Western Michigan 94
 Eastern Michigan 71
 Northern Illinois  37
 Ball State 33

Tournament champs
Central Michigan (15), Akron (6), Buffalo (1), Kent State (1)

Honors

Postseason

Mid–American tournament

NCAA tournament

Postseason awards

Coach of the Year: Keith Dambrot, Akron
Player of the Year: Antonio Campbell, Ohio
Freshman of the Year: James Thompson IV, Eastern Michigan
Defensive Player of the Year:  Khaliq Spicer, Kent State
Sixth Man of the Year: Isaiah Johnson, Akron

Honors

See also
2015–16 Mid-American Conference women's basketball season

References